Liotina hermanni is a species of small sea snail, a marine gastropod mollusk, in the family Liotiidae.

Distribution
This marine species occurs off Queensland, Australia

References

 Dunker, G. 1869. Catalog d. Museum Godeffroy. no IV : 99. Hamburg. [102, no. 1835] [nomen nudum; described by Pilsbry, 1934].
 Pilsbry, H.A. 1934. Notes on the Gastropod Genus Liotia and its allies. Proceedings of the Academy of Natural Sciences, Philadelphia 85: 375-381
 Wilson, B. 1993. Australian Marine Shells. Prosobranch Gastropods. Kallaroo, Western Australia : Odyssey Publishing Vol. 1 408 pp

External links
 To World Register of Marine Species
 Australian Faunal Directory: Liotina hermanni
 

hermanni
Gastropods described in 1869